Neanthophylax subvittatus is the species of the Lepturinae subfamily in long-horned beetle family. This beetle is distributed in United States.

References

Lepturinae
Taxa named by Thomas Lincoln Casey Jr.
Beetles described in 1891